"My Sweet Summer Suite" is a 1976 instrumental single by Love Unlimited Orchestra and written by Barry White, taken from the My Sweet Summer Suite album. The single was #1 for three non consecutive weeks on the Billboard's Hot Dance/Club Play chart, and crossed over to both the soul charts, peaking at #28 (Hot R&B charts), and to the pop charts, where it reached number forty-eight. This single is often cited as a model of "Los Angeles-style" disco song.

References

1976 singles
1976 songs
1970s instrumentals
20th Century Fox Records singles
Disco songs
Songs written by Barry White